The following is a list of mental disorders as defined by the Diagnostic and Statistical Manual of Mental Disorders (DSM) and the International Classification of Diseases (ICD).

The DSM is the American Psychiatric Association's standard reference for psychiatry, which includes over 450 different definitions of mental disorders. The ICD published by the World Health Organization is the international standard system for classifying all medical diseases. It also includes a section on mental and behavioral disorders.

The diagnostic criteria and information in the DSM and ICD are revised and updated with each new version. This list contains conditions which are currently recognized as mental disorders as defined by these two systems. There is disagreement in various fields of mental health care, including the field of psychiatry, over the definitions and criteria used to delineate mental disorders. Of concern to some professionals is whether certain mental disorders should be classified as "mental illnesses" or whether they would be better described as neurological disorders, or in other ways.

Anxiety disorders 

 Separation anxiety disorder
 Specific phobia
 Social anxiety disorder
 Panic disorder
 Agoraphobia
 Generalized anxiety disorder
Selective mutism

Dissociative disorders 

 Dissociative identity disorder
 Dissociative amnesia (psychogenic amnesia)
 Depersonalization-derealization disorder
Dissociative fugue
Dissociative neurological symptom disorder (this includes Psychogenic non-epileptic seizures)
 Other specified dissociative disorder (OSDD)
 Unspecified dissociative disorder
 Ganser syndrome

Mood disorders

Depressive disorders 

 Disruptive mood dysregulation disorder
 Major depressive disorder
 Dysthymia 
 Premenstrual dysphoric disorder
 Psychotic depression
 Seasonal affective disorder (SAD)

 Atypical depression
 Postpartum depression

Bipolar disorders 

 Bipolar I disorder
 Bipolar II disorder
 Bipolar disorder not otherwise specified
 Cyclothymia

Trauma and stressor related disorders 

 Reactive attachment disorder
 Disinhibited social engagement disorder
 Post-traumatic stress disorder (PTSD)
 Acute stress disorder
 Adjustment disorder
 Complex post-traumatic stress disorder (C-PTSD)
 Prolonged grief disorder

Neuro-developmental disorders 

 Intellectual disability
 Language disorder
 Speech sound disorder
 Stuttering
 Social communication disorder
 Communication disorder
 Autism spectrum disorder (formally a category that included Asperger syndrome, Classic autism and Rett syndrome)
 Attention deficit hyperactivity disorder (ADHD)
 Developmental coordination disorder
 Tourette syndrome
 Tic disorder
 Dyslexia
 Dyscalculia
 Dysgraphia
 Nonverbal learning Disorder (NVLD, NLD)

Sleep-wake disorders 

 Insomnia (including chronic insomnia and short-term insomnia)
 Hypersomnia
Idiopathic hypersomnia
Kleine–Levin syndrome
Insufficient sleep syndrome
 Narcolepsy
 Restless legs syndrome
 Sleep apnea
 Night terrors (sleep terrors)
 Exploding head syndrome

Parasomnias 

 Nightmare disorder
 Rapid eye movement sleep behavior disorder
Confusional arousals
Sleepwalking
Hypnagogic hallucinations
Hypnopompic hallucinations

Circadian rhythm sleep disorder 

 Circadian rhythm sleep disorder
 Delayed sleep phase disorder
 Advanced sleep phase disorder
 Irregular sleep–wake rhythm
 Non-24-hour sleep–wake disorder
 Circadian rhythm sleep-wake disorder caused by irregular work shifts
 Jet lag

Neuro-cognitive disorders 

 Delirium
 Dementia
 Traumatic brain injury
HIV-associated neurocognitive disorder (HAND)
Amnesia
Chronic traumatic encephalopathy
Agnosia

Substance-related and addictive disorders

Substance related disorders 

 Substance-induced disorder (Substance-induced psychosis, Substance-induced delirium, Substance-induced mood disorder) 
 Substance intoxication
 Substance withdrawal
 Substance dependence

Disorders due to use of alcohol 
Alcohol use disorder
 Alcoholic hallucinosis
Alcohol withdrawal
Harmful pattern of use of alcohol

Disorders due to use of cannabis 
Cannabis use disorder
 Cannabis dependence
Cannabis intoxication
Harmful pattern of use of cannabis
Cannabis withdrawal
Cannabis-induced delirium
Cannabis-induced psychosis
Cannabis-induced mood disorder
Cannabis-induced anxiety

Disorders due to use of synthetic cannabinoids 

 Episode of harmful use of synthetic cannabinoids
 Harmful pattern of use of synthetic cannabinoids
 Synthetic cannabinoid dependence
 Synthetic cannabinoid intoxication
 Synthetic cannabinoids withdrawal
 Synthetic cannabinoids induced delirium
 Synthetic cannabinoids induced psychotic disorder
 Synthetic cannabinoids induced mood disorder
 Synthetic cannabinoids induced anxiety

Disorders due to use of opioids 

 Episode of harmful use of Opioids
 Harmful pattern of use of Opioids
 Opioid dependence
 Opioid intoxication
 Opioids withdrawal
 Opioids induced delirium
 Opioids induced psychotic disorder
 Opioids induced mood disorder
 Opioids induced anxiety

Disorders due to use of sedative, hypnotic or anxiolytic 

 Episode of harmful use of Sedative, hypnotic or anxiolytic
 Harmful pattern of use of Sedative, hypnotic or anxiolytic
 Sedative, hypnotic or anxiolytic dependence
 Sedative, hypnotic or anxiolytic intoxication
 Sedative, hypnotic or anxiolytic withdrawal
 Sedative, hypnotic or anxiolytic induced delirium
 Sedative, hypnotic or anxiolytic induced psychotic disorder
 Sedative, hypnotic or anxiolytic induced mood disorder
 Sedative, hypnotic or anxiolytic induced anxiety
 Amnestic disorder due to use of sedatives, hypnotics or anxiolytics 
 Dementia due to use of sedatives, hypnotics or anxiolytics

Disorders due to use of Cocaine 

 Episode of harmful use of Cocaine
 Harmful pattern of use of Cocaine
 Cocaine dependence
 Cocaine intoxication
 Cocaine withdrawal
 Cocaine induced delirium
 Cocaine induced psychotic disorder
 Cocaine induced mood disorder
 Cocaine induced anxiety
 Cocaine induced OCD
 Cocaine induced impulse control disorder

Disorders due to use of Amphetamines 

 Episode of harmful use of Amphetamines
 Harmful pattern of use of Amphetamines
 Amphetamines dependence
 Amphetamines intoxication
 Amphetamines withdrawal
 Amphetamines induced delirium
 Amphetamines induced psychotic disorder
 Amphetamines induced mood disorder
 Amphetamines induced anxiety
 Amphetamines induced OCD
 Amphetamines induced impulse control disorder

Disorders due to use of synthetic cathinone 

 Episode of harmful use of synthetic cathinone
 Harmful pattern of use of synthetic cathinone
 Synthetic cathinone dependence
 Synthetic cathinone intoxication
 Synthetic cathinone withdrawal
 Synthetic cathinone induced delirium
 Synthetic cathinone induced psychotic disorder
 Synthetic cathinone induced mood disorder
 Synthetic cathinone induced anxiety
 Synthetic cathinone induced OCD
 Synthetic cathinone induced impulse control disorder

Disorders due to use of caffeine 

 Episode of harmful use of caffeine
 Harmful pattern of use of caffeine 
 Caffeine intoxication
 Caffeine withdrawal
 Caffeine induced anxiety disorder
 Caffeine-induced sleep disorder

Disorders due to use of hallucinogens 

 Episode of harmful use of hallucinogens
 Harmful pattern of use of hallucinogens
 Hallucinogens dependence
 Hallucinogen induced delirium
 Hallucinogens induced psychotic disorder
 Hallucinogens induced anxiety disorder
 Hallucinogens induced mood disorder 
 Hallucinogen persisting perception disorder

Disorders due to use of nicotine 

 Episode of harmful use of nicotine
 Harmful pattern of use of nicotine
 nicotine intoxication
 nicotine withdrawal
 Nicotine dependence

Disorders due to use of volatile inhalants 

 Episode of harmful use of volatile inhalants 
 Harmful pattern of use of volatile inhalants 
 Opioid dependence
 Opioid intoxication
 Volatile inhalants withdrawal
 Volatile inhalants induced delirium
 Volatile inhalants induced psychotic disorder
 Volatile inhalants induced mood disorder
 Volatile inhalants induced anxiety

Disorders due to use of dissociative drugs including ketamine and phencyclidine (PCP) 

 Episode of harmful use of dissociative drugs including ketamine and phencyclidine [PCP]
 Harmful pattern of use of dissociative drugs including ketamine and phencyclidine [PCP]
 Dissociative drugs including ketamine and phencyclidine [PCP] dependence
 Dissociative drugs including ketamine and phencyclidine [PCP] intoxication
 Dissociative drugs including ketamine and phencyclidine [PCP] withdrawal
 Dissociative drugs including ketamine and phencyclidine [PCP] induced delirium
 Dissociative drugs including ketamine and phencyclidine [PCP] induced psychotic disorder
 Dissociative drugs including ketamine and phencyclidine [PCP]induced mood disorder
 Dissociative drugs including ketamine and phencyclidine [PCP] induced anxiety

Non-substance related disorder 

 Gambling disorder
 Video game addiction
 Internet addiction disorder
 Sexual addiction
 Food addiction
 Addiction to social media
 Pornography addiction
 Shopping addiction

Paraphilias 

 Voyeuristic disorder
 Exhibitionistic disorder
 Frotteuristic disorder
 Pedophilia
 Sexual masochism disorder
 Sexual sadism disorder
 Fetishistic disorder
 Transvestic disorder
 Other specified paraphilic disorder

Somatic symptom related disorders 

 hypochondriasis
 somatization disorder
 Conversion disorder (Functional Neurological Symptom Disorder)
 Factitious disorder imposed on self (munchausen syndrome)
Factitious disorder imposed on another (munchausen by proxy)
Pain disorder

Sexual dysfunctions 

 Delayed ejaculation
 Erectile dysfunction
 Anorgasmia
 Vaginismus
 Male hypoactive sexual desire disorder
 Female sexual arousal disorder 
 Premature ejaculation
 Dyspareunia
 Sexual dysfunction

Elimination disorders 

 Enuresis (Involuntary urination)
 Nocturnal enuresis
 Encopresis (Involuntary defecation)

Feeding and eating disorders 

 Pica (disorder)
 Rumination syndrome
 Avoidant/restrictive food intake disorder
 Anorexia nervosa
 Binge eating disorder
 Bulimia nervosa
 Other specified feeding or eating disorder (OSFED)
 Purging disorder
 Diabulimia
 Night eating syndrome
 Orthorexia nervosa

Disruptive impulse-control, and conduct disorders 

 Oppositional defiant disorder
 Intermittent explosive disorder
 Conduct disorder
 Antisocial personality disorder
 Pyromania
 Kleptomania
 Disruptive mood dysregulation disorder

Obsessive-compulsive and related disorders 

 Obsessive–compulsive disorder (OCD)
 Body dysmorphic disorder
 Body integrity dysphoria
 Compulsive hoarding
 Trichotillomania
 Excoriation disorder (Skin picking disorder)
 Body-focused repetitive behavior disorder
 Olfactory reference syndrome
 Primarily obsessional obsessive-compulsive disorder

Schizophrenia spectrum and other psychotic disorders 

 Delusional disorder 
 Schizophrenia
 Schizoaffective disorder
 Schizophreniform disorder
 Brief psychotic disorder

Personality disorders

Cluster A 

 Paranoid personality disorder
 Schizoid personality disorder
 Schizotypal personality disorder

Cluster B 

 Antisocial personality disorder 
 Borderline personality disorder
 Histrionic personality disorder
 Narcissistic personality disorder

Cluster C 

 Avoidant personality disorder
 Dependent personality disorder
 Obsessive–compulsive personality disorder

Other 

 Gender dysphoria (also known as gender integrity disorder or gender incongruence, there are different categorizations for children and non-children in the ICD-11)
 Medication-induced movement disorders and other adverse effects of medication
 Catatonia

See also
 List of neurological conditions and disorders

References

Lists of diseases
Disability-related lists
 List
Mental disorders

de:Liste der psychischen und Verhaltensstörungen nach ICD-10